Mohd Shoaib Hassan (born May 27, 1990 in Lahore) is a professional squash player who represented Pakistan. He reached a career-high world ranking of World No. 167 in July 2008.

References

External links
  (archive 3)
 

1990 births
Living people
Pakistani male squash players